Akatsi North is one of the constituencies represented in the Parliament of Ghana. It elects one Member of Parliament (MP) by the first past the post system of election. Akatsi North is located in the Akatsi North district  of the Volta Region of Ghana. It was created in 2012 by the Electoral Commission of Ghana prior to the Ghanaian general election.

Members of Parliament

Elections
The first ever election was held in December 2012 as part of the Ghanaian elections. The National Democratic Congress candidate won the seat with an 8,908 majority.

See also
List of Ghana Parliament constituencies

References

Parliamentary constituencies in the Volta Region